The Men's 400 metres L4 was a sprinting event in athletics at the 1984 Summer Paralympics. It was unusual in that only one athlete took part. Although single athlete races had not been entirely uncommon during the 1960s, they had become very rare by 1984.

As the sole competitor, John Fisher of Great Britain needed only to complete the race in order to win gold. He did so in a time of 1:35.20.

References 

Men's 400 metres L4